Khok Pho is a district (amphoe) of Pattani province, southern Thailand.

History
The area of the district originally belonged to Mueang Nong Chik, one of the seven provinces of Pattani Kingdom. The district was established by splitting it from Nong Chik district, at first named "Mueang Kao". As the district office was in tambon Makrut it was later renamed "Makrut District".

In 1929 King Rama VII visited the district to see the solar eclipse on 9 May. During this visit he saw a building in Khok Pho which he thought to be more fitting as the district office, thus the office was moved there. In 1939 the district received its current name Khok Pho.

Geography
Neighboring districts are (from the north clockwise): Nong Chik and Mae Lan of Pattani Province; Mueang Yala of Yala province; and Saba Yoi and Thepha of Songkhla province.

Namtok Sai Khao National Park covers an area of 110 km2 of forested hills of the Sankalakhiri mountain range at the border of Pattani, Yala, and Songkhla Provinces.

Administration

Central administration 
Khok Pho is divided into 12 sub-districts (tambons), which are further subdivided into 81 administrative villages (mubans).

Missing numbers are tambons which now form Mae Lan District.

Local administration 
There are three sub-district municipalities (thesaban tambons) in the district:
 Khok Pho consisting of parts of sub-district Khok Pho.
 Na Pradu consisting of parts of sub-district Na Pradu.
 Makrut consisting of sub-district Makrut.

There are 11 sub-district administrative organizations (SAO) in the district:
 Khok Pho consisting of parts of sub-district Khok Pho.
 Bang Kro consisting of sub-district Bang Kro.
 Pa Bon consisting of sub-district Pa Bon.
 Sai Khao consisting of sub-district Sai Khao.
 Na Pradu consisting of parts of sub-district Na Pradu.
 Pak Lo consisting of sub-district Pak Lo.
 Thung Phla consisting of sub-district Thung Phla.
 Tha Ruea consisting of sub-district Tha Ruea.
 Na Ket consisting of sub-district Na Ket.
 Khuan Nori consisting of sub-district Khuan Nori.
 Chang Hai Tok consisting of sub-district Chang Hai Tok.

Places of interest
Wat Chang Hai Rat Buranaram, simply known as Wat Chang Hai. Notable Thai temple, a legendary monk  Luang Pu Thuat was once abbot here.

References

External links
amphoe.com

Districts of Pattani province